A steam bath is a steam-filled room for the purpose of relaxation and cleansing. It has a long history, going back to Greek and Roman times.

History
The origins of the steam bath come from the Roman bath, which began during the height of the Roman Empire. Ancient Roman baths served many community and social functions within Roman society. Many citizens in Rome used Roman public baths, regardless of socioeconomic status. These Roman baths were supplied by natural hot springs from beneath the ground. Archaeological works at the monastic complex in the Makurian city of Hambukol, has revealed the possible use of one of its rooms as a steam bath.

Historical parts of a spa — Roman, medieval, Georgian and Victorian have been restored in Bath, England and is available as a public bath or Thermae.

Modern steam baths
Today, natural steam baths still exist, and often still use similar systems that the Romans used, which contain pipes and pumps that bring water up and into the large pool areas, wherever the natural springs exist. Heaters are also now used to maintain warm temperatures in the baths.

There are many types of steam baths, which are different from saunas. (Both are hot, but the steam in a sauna is created by throwing water on a stove.)

Hammams, steam rooms and steam showers are types of steam bath.

See also 
 Banya (sauna) — A Russian steam bath
 Victorian Turkish bath
 Public bathing
 Sauna
 Thermae

References

External links
Tales of Toronto’s first Jewish shvitz

Bathing